The Lady Is Fickle is a 1942 Italian comedy film directed by Mario Mattoli and starring Ferruccio Tagliavini, Fioretta Dolfi and Carlo Campanini. It was shot at the Cinecittà Studios in Rome. The film's sets were designed by the art director Piero Filippone.

Plot
A poor village teacher has ambitions to be a great singer.

Cast
Ferruccio Tagliavini as Ferruccio Landini
Fioretta Dolfi as Rosetta
Carlo Campanini as Cristoforo
Carlo Micheluzzi as Il commendator Carlo
Dora Bini as Isabella
Arturo Bragaglia as Il direttore della scuola
Rosina Anselmi as Sua moglie
Nucci Bagnani as La sorellina di Rosetta
Galeazzo Benti as Un giovanetto al teatro
Agnese Dubbini as La cuoca
Leo Micheluzzi as Il maggiordomo
Giuliana Pitti as Luisella, sorella di Rosetta
Agostino Salvietti as Il cuoco
Margherita Seglin as La madre di Rosetta
Ciro Berardi
Alberto Capozzi
Totò Mignone

References

Bibliography
Geoffrey Nowell-Smith & Steven Ricci. Hollywood and Europe: Economics, Culture, National Identity, 1945-95. BFI Publishing, 1998.

External links

1942 comedy films
1942 films
Films directed by Mario Mattoli
Films shot at Cinecittà Studios
Italian black-and-white films
Italian comedy films
1940s Italian-language films
1940s Italian films